Otter Township may refer to:

 Otter Township, Saline County, Arkansas, in Saline County, Arkansas
 Otter Township, Warren County, Iowa
 Otter Township, Cowley County, Kansas

Township name disambiguation pages